Saue is a village in Saku Parish, Harju County, Estonia. As of 2011 Census, the settlement's population was 114.

From 1976 to 2014 the village bore the name of Kanama.

References

Villages in Harju County